Arun Harinath (born 26 March 1987) is a former English cricketer, a top-order batsman who played at first-class level for Surrey, Marylebone Cricket Club (MCC), Leicestershire and Loughborough UCCE between 2007 and 2018. He was educated at Tiffin School, and then attended Loughborough University. Born to UK-based Sri Lankan parents Malathy Harinath and Harinath Suppaiah, he married Emily Hodgson in 2018, but they separated in 2021. He has a younger brother Muhunthan Harinath.

Harinath was part of the Surrey setup from the age of nine, and by 2006 was a regular in the county's Second XI. Despite not having made a first-team appearance for Surrey, in October 2008 he was offered a new two-year contract.

He made his first-class debut for Loughborough in April 2007 and his Surrey debut against Gloucestershire in September 2009, playing the last 3 games of the season. He was a regular in the Championship team in 2010 and 2013, playing 12 Championship games in each season but only played one game in 2011. He scored over 500 runs in 2010, 2013 and 2015 and scored a total of 6 centuries. During the 2017 season he spent a period on loan to Leicestershire. He rarely played limited-over cricket for Surrey. He plays for Sutton Cricket Club in the Surrey Championship.

On 8 July 2019, he joined Hampshire on loan for the remainder of the 2019 season. However he did not play in any first-class or List A matches during the 2019 season, or subsequently, for either Surrey or Hampshire. He retired from cricket for a career in finance in 2019.

Notes

References
 
 

1987 births
Living people
English cricketers
Loughborough MCCU cricketers
Marylebone Cricket Club cricketers
Alumni of Loughborough University
Surrey cricketers
Buckinghamshire cricketers
Leicestershire cricketers
People educated at Tiffin School
British sportspeople of Indian descent
British Asian cricketers
People from Sutton, London
Cricketers from Greater London
English cricketers of the 21st century